Red Bluff Creek is a stream in the U.S. state of Georgia. It is a tributary to the Satilla River.

Red Bluff Creek's red bluffs suggest its name.

References

Rivers of Georgia (U.S. state)
Rivers of Atkinson County, Georgia
Rivers of Clinch County, Georgia
Rivers of Ware County, Georgia